Kalinovo is a rural locality (a selo) and the administrative center of Kalinovskoye Rural Settlement, Gribanovsky  District, Voronezh Oblast, Russia. The population was 139 as of 2010. There are 5 streets.

Geography 
Kalinovo is located 32 km west of Gribanovsky (the district's administrative centre) by road. Dmitriyevka is the nearest rural locality.

References 

Rural localities in Gribanovsky District